Latur Road Junction railway station is a main railway station in Latur district, Maharashtra. It falls under the Secunderabad railway division in south central railway zone. Its code is LTRR. It serves Chakur city. The station consists of three platforms. Latur Road has rail connectivity with Latur, Osmanabad, Pune, Lonavala, Karjat, Panvel, Thane, Kalyan, Mumbai, Pandharpur, Miraj, Kolhapur,  Parli Vaijnath, Purna, Hingoli, Washim, Akola, Wardha, Nagpur, Nanded, Nizamabad, Parbhani, Jalna, Aurangabad, Manmad, Nagarsol, Udgir, Bidar, Vikarabad, Secunderabad, Hyderabad,  Warangal, Vijayawada, Kakinada, Tirupati & Bangalore.

Trains 

 Sainagar Shirdi–Vijayawada Express
 Sainagar Shirdi–Kakinada Port Express
 Sainagar Shirdi–Secunderabad Express
 Hyderabad–Aurangabad Passenger
 Miraj–Parli Vaijnath Passenger
 Nagpur–SCSMT Kolhapur Express
 Hyderabad–Hadapsar (Pune) Express
 Mumbai CSMT–Bidar Superfast Express
 Hazur Sahib Nanded–KSR Bengaluru Express
 Purna–Hyderabad Passenger
 Pandharpur–Nizamabad Passenger
 Aurangabad–Tirupati  Express
 Panvel–Hazur Sahib Nanded Express
 Deekshabhoomi Express
 Yesvantpur-Latur Express

References

Railway stations in Latur district